The World Athletics Indoor Championships are a biennial indoor track and field competition served as the global championship for that version of the sport. Organised by the World Athletics, the competition was inaugurated as the World Indoor Games in 1985 in Paris, France and were subsequently renamed to IAAF World Indoor Championships in 1987. The current name was adapted with the name change of the sports governing body in 2019.

They have been held every two years except for when they were held in consecutive years 2003 and 2004 to facilitate the need for them to be held in alternate years to the main World Athletics Championships (outdoors) in the future.

Championships

Events
The events held have remained more or less the same since they originated, with the main alterations coming in the earlier years.

The 4 x 400 m relay race for both men and women was added to the full schedule in 1991 with the women's triple jump, the latter as an exhibition event, and gaining full status at the following championships.

Racewalking events were dropped after 1993, and a 1600 m medley relay was tried but was discontinued were due to poor interest. This same year, a men's heptathlon and women's pentathlon were successfully introduced as non-championship events, and have remained on the program since.

In 1997 the women's pole vault entered the fray, two years before it made an appearance at the event's outdoor counterpart.

Despite the event's popularity, the 200 m was removed from the program after the 2004 championships, as the event was deemed unfair and too predictable, with the tight bends involved in the race meaning any athletes not drawn in either of the outside lanes had minimal or no chance of winning.

Outstanding achievements

Seven gold medals
Mozambique's Maria de Lurdes Mutola won seven gold, one silver and one bronze medal in the women's 800 m from 1993 to 2008.

Natalya Nazarova has won seven gold and one silver medal from 1999 to 2008 in the 400 m and 4 × 400 m relay.

Five gold medals
Cuban Iván Pedroso won five straight golds in the men's long jump from 1993 to 2001.
Stefka Kostadinova of Bulgaria won five gold medals in the women's high jump.
Genzebe Dibaba of Ethiopia won 2 gold medals in the women's 1,500m and 3 gold medals in the 3,000m from 2012 to 2018

Four gold medals
Haile Gebrselassie of Ethiopia won three golds in the 3,000 m and one in the 1,500 m.
Sergey Bubka won four pole vault gold medals (three while competing for the Soviet Union and one for Ukraine).
Cuban Javier Sotomayor won four gold and one bronze medal in the men's high jump.
Stefan Holm of Sweden has won four gold medals in the men's high jump.
Meseret Defar of Ethiopia has won four gold, one silver and one bronze medal in the women's 3,000 m.
Mikhail Shchennikov of Russia has won four gold medals in the 5000 m walk.
Gail Devers of the United States has won 3 golds at 60m and 1 gold and 1 silver at 60m hurdles
Yelena Isinbayeva of Russia has won 4 golds and 1 silver at pole vault
Valerie Adams of New Zealand has won 4 golds and 1 bronze at shot put

Championship records
Key to tables:

X = annulled due to doping violation

Men

Women

Heptathlon disciplines

Pentathlon disciplines

Records in defunct events

Men's events

Women's events

All-time medal table
Medal table includes 1985–2022 Championships.

Notes
  was the name, under which Russian athletes competed in the 2018 Championships. Their medals were not included in the official medal table.

All-time placing table
In the IAAF placing table the total score is obtained from assigning eight points to the first place and so on to one point for the eight place. Points are shared in situations where a tie occurs.

Updated after 2016 Championships

See also
International Athletics Championships and Games

Notes

References

External links
World Athletics Indoor Championships
Event History 1987–2003 from BBC

 
World Indoor Championships in Athletics
Indoor
Recurring sporting events established in 1985
Indoor track and field competitions
Biennial athletics competitions